Gaetano Giardino (24 January 1864 – 21 November 1935) was an Italian soldier that rose to the rank of Marshal of Italy during  World War I.

Life 

Born in Montemagno, he attended the Royal Military Academy of Modena, being appointed Lieutenant of 8th Bersaglieri Regiment. In the late 1880s he joined the Italian forces that were fighting in Eritrea and Sudan and in 1894 he fought in Kassala. He was later named Captain and became a company commander of 6th Bersaglieri Regiment.  In the early years of the 20th century he was named chief of the staff of two different Italian divisions then at the outbreak of the Italo-Turkish War he was named sottocapo di Stato Maggiore (deputy chief of staff) of the Italian expeditionary forces.

World War I 

In  the spring of 1915 when Italy declared war on Austria-Hungary he was named chief of the staff of the IV Army Corps then of the II Army Corps. He later assumed the duty of commander of the 48th Division, then he was named commander of two different Army Corps.
After the Battle of Caporetto and the subsequent changes in Italian highest military positions he became a close adviser of Armando Diaz with the duty to maintain the relations with the other Triple Entente powers. 
April 1918 he was named commander of the 4th Army, a.k.a. the Army of Monte Grappa. In the Battle of Solstizio his army was able to stop the Austrian offensive. During the Battle of Vittorio Veneto the troops under Giardino's leadership were the first Italian troops to attack the Austrian front  in order  to force the Austrian general staff to use the reserve troops against the Italians on Monte Grappa, facilitating the attack along the Piave River that took place three days later. After the armistice of Villa Giusti Giardino’s 4th was disbanded.

Later life 

Between 1923 and 1924 he was named governor of the free state of Fiume. In 1926 he was promoted to the rank of Marshal of Italy.
He died in Torino in 1935 and he is buried together with his soldiers in the war cemetery of Monte Grappa. A monument in his honor has been erected in Bassano del Grappa

References 

1864 births
1935 deaths
People from Montemagno
Field marshals of Italy
Italian generals
Italian military personnel of World War I
Italian military personnel of the Italo-Turkish War